Philipp Pentke (born 1 May 1985) is a German footballer who plays for Bundesliga club 1899 Hoffenheim.

Career

Pentke played for the youth team of BSC Freiberg before moving to Dynamo Dresden in 2001. In 2004, he joined TSV 1860 Munich on a free transfer but he did not make it in the first team and only played for the reserves. After three years, he joined FC Augsburg but again did not play for the first team. In 2008, he transferred to Energie Cottbus II as third goalkeeper. After one year without playing, he joined Chemnitzer FC where he was a regular starter and played 183 matches. 

At the end of the 2014–15 season, Chemnitz told Pentke that they would not extend his contract and so he joined Jahn Regensburg who played at that time in the Regionalliga Bayern. From the beginning of the season, he was first goalkeeper and helped Regensburg to get promoted to the 3. Liga. In the next season, Regensburg reached the play-offs to the 2. Bundesliga against TSV 1860 Munich. In the second leg of the play-offs in the Allianz Arena, supporters of 1860 behind the goal of Pentke started to rip out seats and to throw them in onto the pitch. Pentke had to avoid these objects while playing. Nevertheless, Regensburg won promotion to the 2. Bundesliga.

References

External links
 

1985 births
Living people
TSV 1860 Munich II players
FC Augsburg players
FC Energie Cottbus II players
Chemnitzer FC players
SSV Jahn Regensburg players
TSG 1899 Hoffenheim players
Bundesliga players
2. Bundesliga players
3. Liga players
Regionalliga players
Association football goalkeepers
German footballers